The 1987–88 Northern Counties East Football League season was the 6th in the history of Northern Counties East Football League, a football competition in England.

Premier Division

The Premier Division featured 12 clubs which competed in the previous season, along with five new clubs, promoted from Division One:
Grimethorpe Miners Welfare
Hallam
Harrogate Railway Athletic
Hatfield Main
Ossett Albion

League table

Division One

Division One featured 13 clubs which competed in the previous season, along with three new clubs, promoted from Division Two:
Eccleshill United
Frecheville Community
Immingham Town

Also, Mexborough Town Athletic changed their name to Mexborough Town.

League table

Division Two

Division Two featured 15 clubs which competed in the previous season, no new clubs joined the division this season.

League table

References

1987–88
8